A calibration gas is a reference gas or gas mixture used as comparative standard in the calibration of analytical instruments, like gas analysers or gas detectors.  Therefore, a calibration gas has to be of a precisely defined nature or composition, like zero gas or span gas, for example 500 ppm carbon monoxide in nitrogen.

To be a calibration gas, the gas must be traceable to a national or international standard.  Traceability is the unbroken chain of comparisons to an acceptable international standard.  The calibration gas standard establishes a known analyzer response to a certified chemical component concentration.  In the calibration gas, preparation tolerance (PT) and certification/analytical accuracy (CA) are of utmost importance.

Preparation tolerance is the concentration range that includes minor component and concentration.  PT is measured in range of concentration. It can also be referred to as blending tolerance.
For instance, a calibration gas of 500 ppm CO balance nitrogen having PT +/- 10% contains between 450 ppm and 550 ppm. Preparation tolerance can be minimized by using latest technologies for manufacturing such gases. Preparation tolerance is decided on the basis of the manufacturer's experience and the customer's requirements.

Certification/analytical accuracy is defined as the agreement of measured values with its true value.  Certification values are determined statistically, considering the uncertainties accompanied by the international standard (reference standard) to which it is traceable, instrument uncertainty, and instability (reactivity) of gas in the container.

External links 
 Definition at hiq.linde-gas.com

Gas sensors
Analytical chemistry
Industrial gases